The Curling Masters Champéry is an annual bonspiel, or curling tournament, that takes place at the Palladium de Champéry in Champéry, Switzerland. The tournament is held in a triple-knockout format and is part of the World Curling Tour. The tournament was started in 2011 as part of the Curling Champions Tour.

Past champions

References

External links
Home Page

World Curling Tour events
Curling competitions in Switzerland
Sport in Valais
Champions Curling Tour events